Rajadhani is a 2011 Indian Kannada action crime film directed by debutante Sowmya Sathyan N. R., starring Yash, Prakash Raj, Chetan Chandra, Sathya It also stars Umashree and Sheena Shahabadi, a Mumbai-based model-turned-actress.

This movie is one of the underrated movies of Yash's career. The movie highlights how youths tend to lose their way in society due to wrong parenting and support of corrupt government officials. As a consequence, their contribution to society becomes negative.

Cast
 Yash as Raja
 Prakash Raj as Inspector Ajay
 Sheena Shahabadi
 Chetan Chandra as Chetan
 Sathya as Jaggu
 Ravi Teja as Dhamu
 Sandeep as Nithya
 Raju Talikote as Ravi
 Rajendra Karanth
 Sharath Lohitashwa as ACP Manohar
 Achyuth Kumar as Venkat 
 Vaijanath Biradar as Sairam
 G. K. Govinda Raj 
 Lakshman as Benki Mahadeva
 Ramesh Pandit
 Arun Sagar
 Mumaith Khan as an item number

Music

Arjun Janya composed the soundtrack album and background score for the film. The full album was released on 8 March 2011.

The Hindi Version released in 2012. Produced by Raju Bahruz and all lyrics are written by Kishan Paliwal.

Telugu Version Soundtrack released by Aditya Music in 2012.

Reception

Critical response 

A critic from The Times of India scored the film at 3.5 out of 5 stars and says "Full marks to Yash for his spirited performance in action and emotional sequences. Sheena has very little to do. Prakash Rai as police officer is graceful. Sandeep, Ravitheja, Chethan Chandra and Sathya have done their best. H C Venua's cinematography is amazing, especially in the climax. Music by Arjun is okay". Shruti Indira Lakshminarayana from Rediff.com scored the film at 1.5 out of 5 stars and wrote "Action sequences, especially the climax, were pitted as the highlight of the film. But the jump sequence in the climax definitely doesn't make you hold your breath. Songs by Arjun however pep up the film. In total, the film leaves you asking for more. What could have been a thrilling roller coaster ride ends up being a merry-go-round!". A critic from The New Indian Express wrote "Music director Arun has provided lilting tunes. Ramesh Bhat and Umasri have provided good support. The movie is worth watching by youth, especially those who avoid hard work, and parents who fail to warn their children". B S Srivani from Deccan Herald wrote "He is loud, tough and dances like a dream. Music director Arjun seems to be in competition with the hero - the tunes are robust.Raajadhani ‘tries’ to keep people from ruining themselves. But it is doubtful if it reaches today’s youth. Just like the ones in the film. A pity".

Box office
Rajadhani got a good opening and was a moderate success at the box office. The film's opening proved Yash's newly found fan following after the success of his previous film Modalasala.

References

External links
 Official website

2011 films
2010s Kannada-language films
Films scored by Arjun Janya
Indian gangster films